ESPN SpeedWorld is a Super NES and Sega Genesis video game that was released in 1994 exclusively for North America based on the television series of the same name. The title screen of the video game was partially inspired by the 1993 running of the First Union 400 racing event; which occurred on April 18, 1993. The real-life drivers from the mid-1990s are missing because the game only has an ESPN license and not an official NASCAR license.

Gameplay

Players control NASCAR Winston Cup stock cars as they do laps around various oval tracks, road courses, and superspeedways that are based on the actual NASCAR circuits of the 1990s. All the stock cars in the game have the capability to go up to 200 miles per hour (approximately 322 kilometers per hour). The object of the game is to get as close to first place as possible. This game uses Dr. Jerry Punch and an interactive pit crew to simulate the feeling of racing during the 1993 Winston Cup season. Like most racing games, being in the top positions gives the player more points than being in the bottom positions. Stock cars can be customized with a choice of colors and styles.

Reception
Reviewing the Super NES version, GamePro described the game as "fast, smart, and flat-out fun", praising the inclusion of elements from the TV show, the customization options, and the impressive graphics. Their review of the Genesis version described it as "virtually identical" to the Super NES version.

References

1994 video games
NASCAR video games
North America-exclusive video games
Epic/Sony Records games
Racing video games set in the United States
Sega Genesis games
Super Nintendo Entertainment System games
Video games set in 1993
ESPN video games
Multiplayer and single-player video games
Video games developed in the United States